The Ministry of Education and Sports (MES), is a cabinet-level ministry of Uganda. It is mandated "to provide technical support, guide, coordinate, regulate and promote quality education, training and sports to all persons in Uganda for national integration, development and individual advancement", according to the website of the ministry.

Location
The headquarters of the ministry are located in Embassy House, on King George VI Way, at the corner with Parliament Avenue, in the Central Division of Kampala, Uganda's capital and largest city. The coordinates of the ministry headquarters are:0°18'50.0"N, 32°35'15.0"E (Latitude:0.313889; Longitude:32.587500).

Organisational structure
The ministry is overseen by a cabinet minister, currently Janet Museveni, since 6 June 2016. She is assisted by three ministers of state; Joyce Moriku Kaducu serves as Minister of State for Primary Education, John Chrysestom Muyingo serves as Minister of State for Secondary Education, and Peter Ogwang serves as Minister of State for sports.

Directorates
Administratively, the ministry is divided into three directorates: (a) Directorate of Education Standards, (b) Directorate of Basic and Secondary Education, and (c) Directorate of Higher, Technical and Vocational Education and Training.

Departments

List of ministers
 Janet Museveni (6 June 2016 - present)
 Jessica Alupo (27 May 2011 - 6 June 2016)
 Namirembe Bitamazire (14 January 2005 - 27 May 2011)
 Kiddu Makubuya (1999 - 14 January 2005)

See also
 Politics of Uganda
 Cabinet of Uganda
 Parliament of Uganda
 Education in Uganda

References

External links
 

Government ministries of Uganda
Education in Uganda
Organisations based in Kampala
Education ministries
Sports ministries